Dương Văn Dan (born 20 December 1937) is a Vietnamese former sports shooter. He competed in the 50 metre pistol event at the 1968 Summer Olympics.

References

External links
 

1937 births
Living people
People from An Giang Province
Vietnamese male sport shooters
Olympic shooters of Vietnam
Shooters at the 1968 Summer Olympics
20th-century Vietnamese people